Mareeba  is a rural town and locality in the Shire of Mareeba in Far North Queensland, Australia.  Between 2008 and 2013, it was within the Tablelands Region. The town's name is derived from an Aboriginal word meaning meeting of the waters.

Geography 

The town's main street is the Mulligan Highway which branches off from the Kennedy Highway when coming in from Cairns (63.3 km; 40 miles) away passing localities such as Speewah, Kuranda and Barron Gorge.

The Tablelands railway line enters the locality from the north (Biboohra), passes through the town, and exits to the west (Chewko). The locality is served by the following railway stations (from north to south):

 Floreat railway station, now abandoned
 Mareeba railway station
 Turkinje railway station, now abandoned

The Lotus Glen Correctional Centre is located in Arriga, 14 km; 9 miles outside Mareeba.

History
Prior to European settlement, the area around Mareeba was inhabited by the Muluridji people. They maintained a hunter/gatherer existence in the area between Mount Carbine, Mareeba, Rumula (near Julatten) and Woodville (near Canoona), mainly concentrated between Biboohra and Mount Molloy. In the local Aboriginal language, Mareeba means meeting of the waters - referring to the point at which the Barron River is joined by Granite Creek.

On 26 May 1875 James Venture Mulligan became the first European officially to see the future site of Mareeba when he rode up the eastern bank of the Barron River, and passed the junctions of Emerald Creek and Granite Creek.

The Mareeba area was first settled by Europeans in 1877 by John Atherton, who arrived with cattle at Emerald End, which is just north of the town today. Mareeba quickly became a busy coach stop for Cobb & Co on the road from Port Douglas to Herberton. When the railway arrived in 1893, Mareeba grew into a busy town.

Mareeba Post Office opened on 25 August 1893 (a receiving office named Granite Creek had been open from 1891). A Mareeba Diggings Post Office opened by 1893 and closed in 1905.

Mareeba State School opened on 28 August 1893.

St Thomas of Villanova Catholic School opened on 1 January 1909. St Thomas' celebrated their centenary in 2009. The Mareeba parish of the Roman Catholic Vicariate Apostolic of Cooktown (now the Roman Catholic Diocese of Cairns) was established in 1911.

From 1942 to 1945 during World War II, up to 10,000 Australian and US service personnel used Mareeba Airfield as a staging post for battles in New Guinea and the South West Pacific theatre. The Americans referred to it as Hoevet Field in honour of Major Dean Carol "Pinky" Hoevet who was killed on 16 August 1942. Units that were based at Mareeba included No. 5 Squadron of the Royal Australian Air Force (RAAF), No. 100 Squadron RAAF, the Australian 33rd Light Anti-Aircraft Battery, the 19th Bomb Group of the United States Army Air Forces ( USAAF), the 43rd Bomb Group USAAF and the 8th Fighter Group USAAF. For a period of two years during World War II, Mareeba State School was taken over by the army, so St Thomas’ Catholic School accommodated the entire school population of Mareeba. 

Mareeba Library opened in 1958. It underwent a major refurbishment in 1985.

Mareeba State High School opened on 25 January 1960.

Mareeba is also home to an Albanian Australian community that dates from the interwar period. Built by local Albanian Australians, the Mareeba Mosque was opened on Anzac Day, 1970 and is dedicated to Australian soldiers who lost their lives in war.

On 24 January 2006 St Stephen's Catholic College opened after a nearly 10-year approval process regarding the provision of Catholic secondary education.

At the 2006 census, Mareeba had a population of 6,806.

In the 2011 census, Mareeba had a population of 10,181 people.

In October 2011, most of the land (209 hectares; 516 acres) of the former state farm / research station at Kairi was sold by the Queensland Government, retaining only 26 hectares (65 acres). The sale of the land was to fund the establishment of the Agri-Science Hub at Peters Street in Mareeba. The hub focusses on agricultural research and development, together with education and training. James Cook University is a partner of the hub, researching tropical agriculture, aquaculture and biosecurity. The hub opened on 16 December 2011.

Heritage listings
Mareeba has a number of heritage-listed sites, including:
 136 Walsh Street: Mareeba Shire Hall
 167 Walsh Street: Assay Office

Climate
 
Mareeba has a tropical savanna climate (Köppen: Aw), somewhat modified by its elevation. Mareeba township's tagline reads "300 sunny days a year" because the town is in what is called a rain shadow and is sunnier than the wetter surrounding areas (such as Tully). Though despite its reputation as a sunny place, it only receives 61.8 clear days annually and 59.5 cloudy days.

Economy
Numerous crops are grown throughout Mareeba Shire, including avocados, mangoes, lychees, longans, sugar cane, cashews, macadamias, bananas, pineapples, tea tree oil, coffee, cotton and a variety of vegetables and tropical fruits. Poultry and cattle are also common. Tobacco was once the main grown crop of the local economy, but is no longer grown within the Mareeba shire.

Tourism also contributes to the local economy.

Education
Mareeba has two primary schools, two secondary schools and a TAFE campus. There are also several day care centres in the town.
 St Thomas of Villanova Parish School
 Mareeba State School
 Mareeba State High School
 St. Stephen's Catholic College
 Tropical North Institute of TAFE

Health
Mareeba Hospital is in the Tablelands Health District. It provides 52 beds, with surgical, maternity, pediatric, outpatient, emergency and x-ray facilities.

Sports
Mareeba Gladiators are the local rugby league team. The Gladiators participate in the Cairns District Rugby League competition. They last won the Premiership in 2007.

The Mareeba United Football Club (soccer), known as the Mareeba Bulls is based at Borzi Park, Mareeba: the Bulls have dominated the local football scene for the past decade. The Bulls were Grand Final winners in 2003, premiers, Grand Final Winners and NQ Champions in 2004, FNQ premiers and NQ Champions in 2005, FNQ Grand final winners and 2006 and FNQ premier and NQ Champions in 2008. The sustained success of the Bulls has brought the title for Mareeba as 'Football Capital of North Queensland'. Then in 2009, the Mareeba Bulls entered the Queensland State League, as the FNQ Bulls, incorporating the entire FNQ Football area, being based at the Bulls home ground at Borzi Park, Mareeba. The club then returned to the FNQ premier league in 2013 after the demise of the QLD state league. 
In 2013 they exited the QSL to focus back on their regional competition and junior base and the success again returned in 2014 the club returned to the status of "Football Capital of North Queensland" bringing to the club nine pieces of silverware including the treble in the Premier and Reserve divisions, plus the double in the 2nd division, plus the Mazda Cup. In 2015, the Mareeba Bulls Premier side staged one of the best comebacks seen in FNQ Football history with a come from behind 3-2 win. Down 2-0 with a handful of minutes to go, the Bulls did the unthinkable and scored 3 goals in the space of 7 minutes.

Both the Mareeba Karting Club and the Far North Queensland Motorcycle club hold monthly motor racing meetings at the Makotrac International Racetrack which is located five kilometres from Mareeba.

Amenities 
Mareeba Shire Council operates a public library at 221 Byrnes Street. The library facility opened in 1958, with a major refurbishment in 1985 and minor refurbishment in 2013.

The Mareeba branch of the Queensland Country Women's Association meets at the CWA Hall on the corner of Dempster Street and Wilkes Street. The Cairns Aerial Outpost branch of the Queensland Country Women's Association meets at 15 Wilson Street.

St Thomas of Villanova's Catholic Church is at 59 Constance Street. St Stephen's College at Lot 3 McIver Road also has a Catholic Church. Both are within the Mareeba Parish of the Roman Catholic Diocese of Cairns.

The Mareeba Mosque is at 108 Walsh Street.

Media 
Mareeba is serviced by the following radio stations:
 4AM 558
 ABC Far North 720
 ABC Radio National 105.1
 ABC News Radio 101.1
 ABC Classic 105.9
 Triple J 107.5
 Hit FM 103.5
 KIK FM 88.7
 Rhema FM 92.3
 Triple M 99.5

Hotels

Mareeba has three hotels:
 The Anthill
 The Graham
 The Gateway (known as The Peninsula Hotel before new owners renovated the building in 2015)

Attractions 
Tourist attractions in the Mareeba Shire include the Golden Drop Mango Winery, Jaques Coffee Plantation, Coffee Works, Mareeba Heritage Museum, Mareeba Rock Wallabies and Granite Gorge Nature Park, Emerald Creek Falls, and Davies Creek Falls.

Events
The Mareeba Rodeo and Festival is held annually, with the first Affiliated Mareeba Rodeo held in July 1949 (which is now the home ground of the Gladiators Rugby league team). The rodeo is hosted at the Kerribee Park Rodeo Grounds, located slightly out of town on route to Dimbulah. In 2014, the attendance was 13,000, almost double the town's normal population. A parade through the town is held, and the Rodeo Queen is crowned (the first Princess was crowned in 1959). A ute muster is often staged over the same weekend as the rodeo. In 1999 Mareeba District Rodeo Association Inc. celebrated their 50 years Golden Jubilee of the foundation of the Association and 20 years of the opening of "Kerribee Park".

The FNQ Country Music Festival and Talent Search is held annually at Kerribee Park Rodeo Grounds. The event is hosted by the Walkamin Country Music Club.

Each year on the third Sunday of January, St Thomas's Catholic Church celebrates the Feast of Santo Nino which celebrates Jesus as a child. The event is of special significance to the Filipino Australians. After the Mass, there is a celebratory meal of Filipino cuisine.

Each year, on the second Sunday of September, St Thomas's Catholic Church celebrates the Feast of Our Lady of the Chain. The celebration begins with a procession through various streets of Mareeba and culminates in a fireworks display.

Photo gallery

Notable residents
Aron Baynes (born 1986), Australian basketball player 2014 NBA champion
Harriett Brims (1864-1939), pioneer female commercial photographer
Steven Ciobo (born 1974), Australian politician
Tom Gilmore, Jr. (born 1946), Australian politician
Katie Page (born 1956), CEO of Harvey Norman
Ernest Riordan (1901-1954), Australian politician
Chris Sheppard (born 1981), Australian rugby league player
Wayne Srhoj (born 1982), Australian footballer
Deon St. Mor, Australian business owner and designer
Owsley Stanley, (1935-2011) American counter-culture figure of the 1960s (LSD; The Grateful Dead).

See also
 Mareeba rock-wallaby (Petrogale mareeba) – named after Mareeba

References

External links
 University of Queensland: Queensland Places: Mareeba
 Mareeba State Primary School Website
 Mareeba Heritage Centre Website 
 Mareeba Historical Society

 
Towns in Queensland
Populated places in Far North Queensland
Shire of Mareeba
Queensland in World War II
Localities in Queensland